Globus is a Santa Monica-based movie trailer music-inspired band consisting of a mix of producers, musicians, and vocalists. The band is led by composer and producer Yoav Goren.

History

Foundation 
Globus was founded as a result of increasing demand for Immediate Music to make their work available for a wider audience. The band's live world premiere took place in The Grand Hall, Wembley, London, on 26 July 2006 and their first album, Epicon, was released in August of that same year.  Feeder's Mark Richardson is featured on drums with guest performances by vocalist Scott Ciscon.

Later years 
In 2011 Globus released their second album, Break From This World, with Ciscon returning for some performances together with Dutch singer Anneke van Giesbergen. The latter also actively participated in the album's development, helping write some of the lyrics for the song Mighty Rivers Run.

In the following years, Globus' activity declined, as creative director Yoav Goren worked on other composing and producing projects.

Return 

But in mid-2018, the group announced that they had restarted work. On 4 November 2020, a rendition of John Lennon's "Gimme Some Truth" (1971) was released, the band's first studio recording in over 9 years, and the first of a so-called Election 2020 trilogy of covers.

On 25 February 2022, the band released You and I performed by Dann Pursey as the first of three singles for a third studio album Cinematica, which was released on October 14, 2022.

Musical style 
Globus is considered to have been a pioneer of the then relatively young Epic Music genre. As a result, their musical style range from orchestral arrangements to symphonic rock with elements of world music  and symphonic metal. Some of their compositions have been used as trailer music, such as Preliator, which was featured in the trailers for Spider-Man 2 and The Dukes of Hazzard as well as the "Epic" promo for PlayStation Move.  A portion of their Epicon "Preliator" track was used for the final sinking of the Japanese warship "Yamato" feature (2005).

Discography

Studio albums

Epicon (2006)

Break from This World (2011)

Cinematica (2022)

Live albums 

 Epic Live! (2010)
 Studio Live (2012)

Singles 

 Prelude (On Earth as in Heaven)
 Spiritus Khayyam
 Orchard of Mines
 Wyatt Earth
 Preliator
 Europa
 Save Me
 Gimme Some Truth (John Lennon Cover)
 I'm Afraid Of Americans (David Bowie Cover)
 Democracy (Leonard Cohen Cover)
 You and I
 Brothers In Arms
 Recover

DVDs 

 Live at Wembley (2008)

Band members 
 Yoav Goren - keyboards, Lead vocals
 Daniel Pursey - guitar, Lead vocals
 Lisbeth Scott - Lead vocals
 Scott Ciscon - Lead vocals
 Anneke van Giersbergen - Lead vocals
 Ryan Hanifl - guitar, Lead vocals
 Jane Runnalls - Lead vocals
 Lindsay Solo - Lead vocals
 Adam Max Goren - Lead vocals
 Stacy Wilde - Lead vocals
 Christine Navarro - backing vocals 
 Sammy Allen - backing vocals
 Tate Simms - bass
 Mark Richardson - lead drums
 Jeffrey Fayman - percussion, drums
 Robert Fripp - guitar 
 Kfir Melamed - bass
 Hiro Goto - strings
 Mike Horick - drums 
 Bernard Yin - guitars
 Ariel Mannn - guitars

See also 
 Nick Phoenix
 Thomas J. Bergersen
 Two Steps from Hell

For more orchestral bands related to Globus (music), see the Trailer music article.

References

External links
Globus Music - Official Website
Trailer Music Live official website
Epicon review at Trailer Music News
Epicon Review at Tracksounds 
Facebook Page

 
Musical groups established in 2006
Musical groups from California